GNU Circuit Analysis Package (Gnucap) is a general purpose circuit simulator started by Albert Davis in 1993. It is part of the GNU Project. The latest stable version is 0.35 from 2006. The latest development snapshot (as of November 2017) is from October 2017 and is usable.

It performs nonlinear DC and transient analysis, Fourier analysis, and AC analysis linearized at an operating point. It is fully interactive and command driven. It can also be run in batch mode or as a server. The output is produced as it simulates.

See also

 Comparison of EDA Software
 List of free electronics circuit simulators

References

External links
 
 Old official website

Circuit Analysis Package
Electronic circuit simulators
Electronic design automation software for Linux